Carradice is a surname. Notable people with the surname include:

 Ian Carradice, expert on coinage
 Phil Carradice (born 1947), Welsh writer and broadcaster

See also
Carradice of Nelson, an English family firm that makes saddlebags and other cycle luggage
Carradine